Illinois Route 60 (IL 60) is a  east–west state highway in Lake County, in northeastern Illinois. It connects the village of Volo at Illinois Route 120 (Belvidere Road) just east of Illinois Route 59 with the city of Lake Forest at U.S. Highway 41 (Skokie Highway).

Route description 

Illinois 60's northern terminus is at a T-intersection in Volo with Illinois 120. It runs south as a 2-lane road serving a mix of farmland and suburban neighborhoods in Grayslake and Round Lake. Running south through Mundelein, the roadbed begins to carry Illinois 83.

Illinois 60 overlaps with Illinois Route 83 south of Ivanhoe where Illinois 83 curves around U.S. Route 45. It is called Town Line Road east of Illinois 83 and west of the Tri-State Tollway (Interstate 94), because Illinois 60 straddles the line separating Vernon and Libertyville Townships for most of its length. Through Lake Forest to the east, Route 60 is called Kennedy Road.

Route 60, especially the portion between Milwaukee Avenue and Interstate 94 in Mettawa, experiences unusually heavy traffic for an arterial road, although less so in recent years.

History 
SBI Route 60 was the current U.S. Route 12 from the Wisconsin state line to Chicago. This was dropped in 1938. In February 1967, IL 60 was brought back to replace IL 59A as part of replacing some superfluous designations. In 1972, Illinois 60 was removed east of U.S. 41 due to the decommissioning of IL 42.

Major intersections

References

External links

060
U.S. Route 12
Transportation in Lake County, Illinois
Mundelein, Illinois
Vernon Hills, Illinois
Lake Forest, Illinois